The use of water power in Britain was at its peak just before the Industrial Revolution. The need for power was great and steam power had not yet become established. It is estimated that at this time there were well in excess of ten thousand watermills in the country.  Most of these were corn mills (to grind flour), but almost any industrial process needing motive power, beyond that available from the muscles of men or animals, used a water wheel, unless a windmill was preferred.

Today only a fraction of these mills survive. Many are used as private residences, or have been converted into offices or flats. A number have been preserved or restored as museums where the public can see the mill in operation.

This is a list of some of the surviving watermills and tide mills in the United Kingdom.

England

Bedfordshire

Bowman's Watermill, Astwick
Bromham Watermill, Bromham
Clophill Watermill, Clophill
Stotfold Watermill, Stotfold
The Olde Watermill, Barton-le-Clay

Berkshire

Abbey Mill, Reading
Calcot Mill, Reading
Chamberhouse Mill, Thatcham
Dun Mill, Hungerford
Denford Mill, Hungerford
Eddington Mill, Eddington
Hungerford Mill, Thatcham
Sandford Mill, Reading
Sindlesham Mill, Reading
Twyford Mill, Twyford
Watermill Theatre, Bagnor
Weston Mill, Weston

Buckinghamshire

Castlethorpe Mill, Castlethorpe
Dodd's Mill, Chenies
Ford End Mill, Ivinghoe
Hambleden Mill, Hambleden
Haversham Mill, Haversham
Pann Mill, High Wycombe

Cambridgeshire

Elton Mill, Elton
Hauxton Mill, Hauxton
Hinxton Mill, Hinxton
Hook's Mill, Guilden Morden
Houghton Mill, Houghton
Lode Watermill, Lode
Maxey Mill, Maxey
Old Mill, Water Newton
Topcliffe Mill, Meldreth
Sacrewell Mill, Peterborough
Soham Mill, Soham

Cheshire

Bunbury Mill, Bunbury
Church Minshull Mill, Church Minshull
Dee Mills - site of, Chester
Dunham Massey Sawmill, Altrincham
Nantwich Mill, Nantwich
Nether Alderley Mill, Macclesfield
Quarry Bank Mill, Styal
Stretton Watermill, Stretton
Trafford Mill, Mickle Trafford, Chester
Walk Mill, Waverton, Cheshire Built 2008

Cornwall

Bar Pool Mill, Falmouth
Boscastle Mill, Boscastle
Carbeal Tide Mill, Torpoint
Carthew Mill, Carthew
Cotehele Mill, Calstock
Dinham Tide Mill, St Minver
Gerrans Sea Mill, Gerrans
Heskyn Mill, Tideford
Hingham Mill, near Wadebridge
Kestle Mill, Kestle
Little Petherick Creek tide mill, Little Petherick
Melinsay Mill, Veryan
Penpoll tidemill, Feock
Perranarworthal Manor Mill, Perranarworthal
Poltesco Higher Mill, Ruan Minor
Poltesco Lower Mill, Ruan Minor
Polvellan or Pool Tide Mill, Looe
Poughill Mill, Bude
Salter Tide Mill, Saltash
Tregarus Mill St Stephen
Tregidden Mill, Tregidden
Tregoose Old Mill St Columb Major
Trevillett Mill, Tintagel
Treway Mill, Zennor
Wheal Martyn, Carthew

Cumbria

Acorn Bank Mill, Penrith
Beckside Mill, Kirkby-in-Furness
Blennerhassett Mill, Aspatria
Brampton Mill, Appleby
Boot Watermill, Eskdale
Gleaston Water Mill, Ulverston
Heron Corn Mill, Milnthorpe
High Mill, Alston
Little Salkeld Watermill, Penrith
Muncaster Mill, Ravenglass
Old Fulling Mill, Ambleside
Rutter Mill, Great Asby
Sparket Mill, Hutton
Stott Park Bobbin Mill, Ulverston
Wythop Mill, Embleton

Derbyshire

Arkwrights Mill, Cromford
Caudwells Mill, Rowsley
Derby Silk Mill
Haarlem Mill, Wirksworth
Masson Mill, Matlock Bath
Stainsby Mill, Chesterfield
Lumsdale Mills, Matlock

Devon

Bicclescombe Mill, Ilfracombe
Bicklegh Mill, Tiverton
Clyston Mill, Broadclyst
Coldharbour Mill, Cullompton
Cricklepit Mill, Exeter
Docton Mill, Hartland
Finch Foundry, Okehampton
Hele Mill, Hele Bay, Ilfracombe
Manor Mill, Seaton
Morwellham Quay, Gunnislake
Otterton Mill, Budleigh Salterton
Sidbury Mill, Sidbury
Town Mills, Chudleigh
Town Mill, Totnes

Dorset

Boar Mill, Corfe Castle
Cann Mill, Shaftesbury
Castleton Water Wheel Museum, Sherborne
Hembury Mill, Askerswell
King's Mill, Marnhull
Loverley Mill, Moor Crichel
Maiden Newton Mill, Maiden Newton
Mangerton Mill, Bridport
Melbury Abbas Mill Shaftesbury
Pegg's Farm Mill, Iwerne Minster
Place Mill, Christchurch
Sturminster Newton Mill, Sturminster Newton
Town Mill, Lyme Regis
White Mill, Sturminster Marshall
Upwey Mill, Weymouth

Durham

Brignall Mill, River Greta
Killhope Wheel, Killhope
Leap Mill Farm, Burnopfield
Path Head Mill, Blaydon
Old Fulling Mill, Durham

East Sussex

Bartley Mill, Bells Yew Green
Bateman's Park Mill, Burwash
Hellingly Watermill, Hellingly
Michelham Priory Mill, Hailsham
Park Mill, Etchingham
Sheffield Mill, Furners Green
Tide Mills, Newhaven
See also:-
Medway watermills

East Yorkshire

Beswick Mill, Beswick
Corn Mill, Stamford Bridge
Old Mill, Sutton upon Derwent
Welton High Mill, Welton

Essex

Alderford Mill, Sible Hedingham
Beeleigh Mill, Maldon
Bourne Mill, Colchester
Bran End (wheel and machinery removed in 1932), Stebbing, River Chelmer
Easterford Mill, Kelvedon
Elmbridge (ceased working 1933, converted to a house in 1940), Little Easton, River Chelmer
Felsted (ceased working 1960, converted to a house), River Chelmer
Fyfield Mill,  Fyfield
Harlow Mill, Harlow
Hartford End (ceased working 1929, converted to a house 1970s), River Chelmer
Hylands Mill Hylands Park, River Wid
Little Hallingbury Mill, Little Hallingbury
Little Parndon Mill, Little Parndon
Roydon Mill, Roydon
Roxwell Mill (ceased working 1926, converted into house c.1950), Roxwell, River Can 
Stebbing Town Mill, Stebbing, River Chelmer
Thorrington Tide Mill, Thorrington
Tilty (ceased working 1957, Domesday mill), Tilty Abbey, River Chelmer
Writtle Mill (ceased working 1957, Domesday mill), Writtle, River Wid

Gloucestershire

Arlington Mill, Bibury
Dean Heritage Centre, Cinderford
Egypt Mill, Nailsworth
Kilcott Mill, Hillesley
Little Aston Mill, Upper Slaughter
Old Mill, Lower Slaughter
Owlpen Manor, Owlpen
Stanway Watermill, Stanway, Cheltenham
Syreford Mill, Andoversford

Greater London

Butter Hill Mill, Carshalton
Clock Mill, Bromley-by-Bow
House Mill, Bromley-by-Bow
Merton Abbey Mills, Merton
Ravensbury Mill, Morden
Upper Mill, Carshalton

Hampshire

Abbey Mill, Bishops Waltham
Abbey Mill, Winchester
Alderholt Mill, Fordingbridge
Anstey Mill, Alton
Ashlett Mill, Fawley
Barton's Mill, Old Basing
Beaulieu Tide Mill, Beaulieu
Beaurepair Mill, Sherborne St John
Botley Mill, Botley
Bourne Mill, Farnham
Bourne Place Mill, Farnham
Chase Mill, Bishops Waltham
Chesapeake Mill, Wickham, Hampshire
Durley Mill, Botley
Eling Tide Mill, Eling
Fulling Mill, Old Alresford
Gaters Mill, West End
Greatham Mill, Greatham
Greywell Mill, Greywell
Hartley Mill, Hartley Wespall
Hatch Mill, Farnham
Headley Water Mill, Headley
High Mill, Farnham
Hockley Mill, Twyford
Isington Mill, Binstead
Laverstoke Mill, Laverstoke
Longbridge Mill, Sherfield on Loddon
Lower Mill, Old Basing
Lower Neatham Mill, Alton
Monxton Mill, Monxton
New Mill, Eversley
Old Mill, Selborne
Paulton's Park Sawmill, Paultons Park
Pilcot Mill Dogmersfield
Quay Mill, Emsworth
Rooksbury Mill, Andover
St Cross Mill, Winchester
Sadler's Mill, Romsey
Shawford Mill, Shawford
Town Mills, Andover
Turk's Farm Mill, Bentley, Hampshire
Upper Mill, Longparish
Weir Mill, Old Alresford
Whitchurch Silk Mill, Whitchurch
Willey Mill, Farnham
Winchester City Mill, Winchester
Woodmill, Southampton

Hertfordshire

Kingsbury Watermill, St Albans
Mill Green Watermill, Hatfield
Moor Mill, Bricket Wood
New Barnes Mill, St Albans
Park Mill, St Albans
Pre Mill, St Albans
Redbournbury Mill, Redbourn
Shafford Mill, St Albans
Sopwell Mill, St Albans

Isle of Wight

Calbourne Mill, Calbourne
Gatcome Mill, Gatcombe
Lower Calbourne Mill, Calbourne
Pan Mill, Newport
St Cross Mill, Newport
St Helens Tidal Mill St Helens
Tidal Mill, Yarmouth
Yafford Mill, Yafford

Kent

Ashbourne Mill, Tenterden
Bartley Mill, Frant
Bradley's Mill, Speldhurst
Chilham Mill, Chilham
Christmas Mill, Edenbridge
Crabble Corn Mill, Dover
Chart Gunpowder Mills, Faversham
Furnace Mill, Lamberhurst
Hever Watermill, Hever (Medway)
Hope Mill, Goudhurst
Hythe Watermill, Hythe
Periwinkle Mill, Milton Regis
Swanton Mill, Mersham (Stour)
Ryarsh Mill, Ryarsh (Medway)
Wandle Mill, Benenden

See also:-
Medway watermills
Medway watermills (lower tributaries)
Medway watermills (middle tributaries)
Medway watermills (upper tributaries)
Stour watermills

Lancashire

Higher Mill, Helmshore, Rossendale
Thurnham Mill, Conder Green
Forge Bank Mill, Halton

Leicestershire

Claybrooke Mill, Claybrooke Magna
Cotes Mill, Cotes
Mill On The Soar, Broughton Astley
Shepshed Watermill, Shepshed
Glenfield Watermill Glenfield

Lincolnshire

Alvingham Mill, Alvingham
Atkin's Mill, Scopwick
Baines Mill, Louth
Baldock's Mill, Bourne
Bridge Street Mill, Louth
Church Mill, Market Rasen
Claypole Mill, Claypole
Claythorpe Mill, Aby
Cogglesford Mill, Sleaford
Crown Mill, Louth
Hibaldstow Wind and Water Mill, Hibaldstow
Holdingham Mill, Holdingham
Hubbards Hill Mill, Louth
Hudd's Mill, Stamford
James Street Mill, Louth
Ketsby Mill, South Ormsby
King's Mill, Stamford
Londonthorpe Mill, Manthorpe
Manor Mill, Kirkby Green
Molecey's Mill West Deeping
Spittlegate Mill, Grantham
Stevenson's Mill, Horncastle
Stockwith Mill, Hagworthingham
Tealby Thorpe Mill, Tealby
Tetford Mill, Tetford
Thoresway Waterwheel, Thoresway
Tyson's Mill, Tealby
Westgate Mill, Louth
Whitton's Mill, Gainsborough
Young's Mill, Kirkby Green

Norfolk

Aldborough Watermill on Scarrow Beck
Bintree Mill, Dereham
Bolwick Hall Watermill on the Mermaid
Congham Oil Mill near Congham
Eade's Watermill at Great Witchingham
Foulden Mill, Foulden
Gimingham Watermill on the River Mun
Gresham Watermill, Gresham,
Gunton Park Sawmill, Gunton Park
Heacham Watermill
Hempstead Watermill
Kettle Watermill, King's Lynn
Letheringsett Watermill, Holt
Little Cressingham Wind and Water Mill, Little Cressingham
Mundesley Watermill on the River Mun
Narborough Bone Mill on the River Nar 
Sheringham Watermill, Sheringham
Snettisham Watermill, Snettisham
Weybourne Watermill

Northamptonshire

Ashton Mill, Oundle
Billing Mill, Billing
Hardwater Mill, Great Doddington
Towcester Mill, Towcester

North Yorkshire

Darley Mill Centre, Nidderdale
Esk Mill, Danby
Fountains Abbey Mill, Ripon
Gayle Mill, Hawes, Wensleydale
Howsham Mill, Malton
 Low Mill, Bainbridge
Pateley Bridge Watermill, Nidderdale
Raindale Mill, York
Tocketts Mill, Guisborough
The Mill, West Burton

Northumberland

Heatherslaw Mill, Etal
Ridley Mill, Stocksfield
Whittle Mill, Horsley

Nottinghamshire

Bath Mill, Mansfield
Cuckney Mill, Cuckney
Fiskerton Mill, Fiskerton
Ollerton Mill, Ollerton
Rufford Mill, Rufford
Warsop Mill, Warsop

Oxfordshire

Ascott Mill, Ascott-under-Wychwood
Bliss Tweed Mill, Chipping Norton
Charney Mill, Charney Bassett
Church Mill, Standlake
Combe Mill, Long Hanborough
Goring Mill, Goring-on-Thames
Little Clanfield Mill, Clanfield
Lower Kingstone Mill, Ashbury
Mapledurham Watermill, Mapledurham
The Mill at Sonning, Sonning Eye
Standhampton Mill, Stadhampton
Venn Mill, Garford
Wroxton Mill, Wroxton

Shropshire

Borle Mill, Netherton, Highley - Former 13th century Corn Mill.
Daniels Mill, Bridgnorth
Upton Mill, Little Hereford, Shropshire.
Wrickton Mill, Neenton

Somerset

Bishop's Lydeard Mill, Bishops Lydeard
Burcott Mill, Burcot
Clapton Mill, Ston Easton
Claverton Pumping Station, Claverton
Combe House Hotel (originally a tannery) Holford
Combe Sydenham Mill, Combe Sydenham
Dunster Working Watermill, Dunster
Gants Mill, Pitcombe
 Hestercombe Mill, West Monkton
Hinton Farm Mill, Mudford
Hornsbury Mill, Chard
Orchard Mill, Williton
Piles Mill, Allerford
Priston Mill, Priston
Rode Mill, Rode
Saltford Brass Mill, Saltford
Stratford Mill, Henbury
Tonedale Mills, Wellington
Williton Mill, Williton
Wookey Hole Paper Mill, Wells

South Yorkshire

Abbeydale Industrial Hamlet, Sheffield
 Bedgreave New Mill, Killamarsh
Sharrow Mills, Sheffield
Shepherd Wheel, Sheffield
Top Forge, Thurgoland
Worsbrough Mill, Barnsley]
Wortley Top Forge, Wortley

Staffordshire

Boar Mill, Moddershall
Brindley Water Mill, Leek
Cheddleton Flint Mill, Cheddleton
Coppice Mill, Stone
Flint Mill, Stone
Hayes Mill, Oulton
Ivy Mill, Oulton
Little Aston Mill, Little Aston
Mosty Lea Mill, Moddershall
Offley Mill, Staffordshire
Shugborough Estate Mill, Shugborough Hall, Stafford
Splashy Mill, Lower Moddershall
Weaver's Mill, Stone
Worston Mill, Great Bridgeford

Suffolk

Alton Mill, Stowmarket
Euston Mill, Euston
Flatford Mill, East Bergholt
Letheringham Mill Letheringham
Pakenham Watermill, Bury St Edmunds
The Mill Hotel, Sudbury
Wickham Mill, Wickham Market
Woodbridge Tide Mill, Woodbridge

Surrey

Abbey Mill, Eashing
Albury Mill, Albury
Botting's Mill, Postford
Cobham Mill, Cobham
Cosford Mill, Thursley
Coxes Lock Mill, Addlestone
Eashing Mill, Eashing
Elstead Mill, Elstead
Enton Mill, Witley
Gresham Mill, Old Woking
Gomshall Mill, Gomshall
Hatch Mill, Godalming
Haxted Watermill, near Edenbridge
Heath Mill, Worplesdon
Netley Mill, Shere
Ockford Mill, Godalming
Ockham Mill, Ockham
Old Castle Mill, Pixham
Paddington Mill, Abinger
Pirbright Mill, Pirbright
Pippbrook Mill, Dorking
Pixham Mill, Dorking
Rickford's Mill, Worplesdon
Shalford Mill, Guildford
Sickle Mill, Shottermill
Snowdenham Mill, Bramley
Stanford Mill, Haslemere
Stoke Mill, Guildford
Town Mill, Guildford
Unwin's Mill, Old Woking
Upper Mill, Ewell
Wonersh Mill, Wonersh

Tyne and Wear

Jesmond Dene Mill, Jesmond
Path Head Watermill, Blaydon

Warwickshire

Arrow Mill, Alcester
Charlecote Mill, Stratford-upon-Avon
Saxon Mill, Warwick
Wellesbourne Watermill, Wellesbourne

West Midlands

New Hall Mill, Sutton Coldfield
Sarehole Mill, Hall Green, Birmingham

West Sussex

Burton Mill, Petworth
Coultershaw Beam Pump, Petworth
Horsted Keynes Mill, Horsted Keynes
Ifield Water Mill, Crawley
Lurgashall Watermill, Singleton
Westhampnett Mill
Woods Mill, Henfield

West Yorkshire

Armley Mills, Armley
Moorside Mills, Eccleshill
Scarcroft Watermill
Thwaite Mills, Leeds
Queen's Mill, Castleford

Wiltshire
Blackland Mill, Blackland (near Calne)
Coleshill Mill, Swindon
White's Mill, West Lavington
Broad Town Mill, Broad Town

Worcestershire

Churchill Forge Mill, Churchill
Fladbury Watermill, Worcestershire
Forge Mill, Redditch
Knowles Mill, Bewdley
Mortimers Cross Mill, Lucton
Newnham Mill, Newnham Bridge

Scotland

Aberdeenshire

Benholm Mill, Johnshaven
Bucket Mill, Finzean
Mill of Mindoro, Bridge of Don
Mill of Towie, Drummuir

Angus

Aberfeldy Mill, Aberfeldy
Barry Mill, Carnoustie

Dumfries and Galloway
Barburgh Mill, Closeburn
Enterkinfoot Mill, Enterkinfoot
Mennock Mill, Mennock
Mill on the Fleet, Gatehouse of Fleet
New Abbey Mill, New Abbey

East Ayrshire

Aiket Mill, Dunlop
Bloak Mill, Dunlop
Busbie Mill, Knockentiber
Dalmore Mill, Stair
Dalmusternock Mill
Drumastle Mill, Dalry
Giffen Mill, Barrmill
Kilmaurs Mill, Kilmaurs
Ladeside Mill, Mauchline
Laigh Milton Mill, Gatehead
Lainshaw Mill, Stewarton
Lambroch Mill, Stewarton
Old or Commoncraigs Mill, Dunlop

East Lothian

Knowes Mill], East Linton
Preston Mill, East Linton

East Renfrewshire
Knowes Mill

Highlands
Click Mill, Kingussie

Lanarkshire
Carmichael Mill, Hyndford Bridge
New Lanark Mill, New Lanark

Moray
Old Mills, Elgin

North Ayrshire

Bark Mill, Beith
Broadstone Mill, Barrmill
Cavan Mill, Auchentiber
Coldstream Mill, Beith
Craigmill, Dalry
Cranshaw Mill, Kilmaurs
Crevoch Mill, Dunlop
Cunninghamhead Mill, Cunninghamhead
Dalgarven Mill, Kilwinning
Drumastle Mill, Dalry
Drumbuie Mill, Barrmill
East Kersland Mill, Dalry
Giffen Mill, Barrmill
Giffordland Mill, Dalry
Kersland Mill, Beith
Mill o'Beith, Beith
Nethermill, Kilbirnie
Perceton Mill, Irvine
Sevenacres Mill, Kilwinning
Stevenston Corn Mill

Orkney

Barony Mill, Birsay
Dounby Click Mill, Dounby
Tormiston Mill, Stenness
Sourin Mill, Rousay

Perthshire

Blair Athol Mill, Pitlochry
Keithbank Mill, Blairgowrie
Lower City Mill, Perth
Stanley Mill, Stanley

Renfrewshire

Meikle Millbank Mill, Lochwinnoch

Scottish Borders
Robert Small's Printing Works, Innerleithen

Shetland
Crofthouse Museum, Dunrossness
Huxter Mills, Sandness
Quendale Mill, South Mainland

South Ayrshire

Dutch Mill, Alloway
Mill of Fail, Tarbolton
Millburn Mill, Tarbolton
Millmannoch, Drongan
Newton or Malt Mill

Western Isles
Siabost Mill, Shawbost
 Garrabost Mill, Garrabost

West Lothian
 Livingston Mill, Livingston

Northern Ireland

County Antrim
Orr's Mill, Milltown
Patterson's Spade Mill, Templepatrick
Whiggleton Mill, Kells

County Down

Annalong Mill, Annalong
Castle Ward Mills, Strangford
Coal Island Spade Mill, Ulster Folk and Transport Museum
Dundonald Old Mill, Dundonald
Gorticashel Flax Mill, Ulster Folk and Transport Museum
Straid Mill, Ulster Folk and Transport Museum
Marybrook Mills, Listooder

County Fermanagh
Florence Court Sawmill, Enniskillen

County Tyrone

Ballynasaggart Mill, Ballygawley
Ennish Mill, Dungannon
Wellbrook Beetling Mill, Cookstown

Wales

Clwyd

Bersham Ironworks, Bersham
Corn Mill, Llangollen
Felin Isaf, Glan Conwy
Gresford Mill, Gresford
King's Mill, Wrexham
Marford Mill, Rossett
Minera Lead Mine, Coedpoeth
Nant Mill, Coedpoeth
Penmachno Woollen Mill, Penmachno
Pentrifoelas Mill, Pentrefoelas
Rossett Mill, Rossett
Trefriw Woollen Mill, Trefriw

Dyfed

Blackpool Mill, Martletwy
Cambrian Mill, Dre-fach Felindre
Carew Tidal Mill, Carew
Cenarth Mill, Cenarth
Denant Mill, Dreenhill
Dre-fach Felindre
Dyfi Furnace, Furnace
Felin Ganol, Llanrhystud
Felin Geri, Cwm Cou
Felin Hesgwm, Dinas Cross
Felin Newydd, Crugybar
Felin yr Aber Llanwnnen
Llywernog Mine, Llywernog
Middle Mill, Solva
Nant y Coy Mill, Wolf's Castle
Rock Mill, Llandysul
Tide Mill, Carew
Tide Mill, Pembroke
Tregwynt Woollen Mill, Castlemorris
Y Felin, St. Dogmaels

Gwent

Gelligroes Mill, Pontllanfraith
Monnow Mill, Osbaston

Gwynedd
Brynkyr Woollen Mill, Garndolbenmaen
Cochwillan Mill, Talybont
Felin Faesog, Clynnog Fawr
Melin Howell, Llanddeusant
National Slate Museum, Llanberis
Pant-yr-Ynn Mill, Blaenau Ffestiniog

Mid Glamorgan
Melin Pontrhydycyff, Llangynwyd
Pentre Mill, Pentre

Powys
Bacheldre Mill, Montgomery
Felin Crewi, Penegoes
Talgarth Mill, Talgarth

South Glamorgan

Deheufryn Gorse Mill, St Fagans
Esgair Moel, St Fagans
Melin Bompren, St Fagans
Rhayader Tannery, St Fagans
Tŷ'n Rhos Sawmill, St Fagans

West Glamorgan
Abbey Woolen Mill, Swansea
Aberdulais Falls, Aberdulais
Y Felin Dolwys, Parkmill

Channel Islands

Guernsey
St Peter's Mill, St Peter's

Jersey

Moulin de Lecq, La Greve de Lecq
Quetivel Mill, St Peter's Valley
Tesson Mill, St Peter's Valley

Isle of Man 

Cregg Mill, Ballasalla
Glen Wylin Mill, Kirk Michael
Golden Meadow Mill, Castletown
Groudle Glen, Isle of Man
Lady Isabella Waterwheel, Laxey
Water-driven Carousel, Ballasalla

See also
Mills on the River Wey and its tributaries
List of windmills in the United Kingdom
Windmill
Windpump
Tide Mill

References

Bibliography
Martin Watts: Watermills, Shire Publications Ltd, UK, 2006
Jim Woodward-Nutt & Jenny West: Mills Open, Society for the Protection of Ancient Buildings, UK, 1997
Neil Wright (Ed), Lincolnshire's Industrial Heritage, Society for Lincolnshire History and Archaeology, UK 2004,

External links
A catalogue tide mills by county
Video footage of Mennock Mill in Nithsdale
UK Mills
Mills Archive

 
Lists of buildings and structures in the United Kingdom
United Kingdom geography-related lists
United Kingdom
Watermills